The English River Dene Nation is a Dene First Nation band government in Patuanak, Saskatchewan, Canada. Their reserve is in the northern section of the province. Its territories are in the boreal forest of the Canadian Shield. This First Nation is a member of the Meadow Lake Tribal Council (MLTC).

Traditionally, English River First Nation are known in Chipewyan (Denesuline) as "People of the Great River" (Des Nëdhë́’iné), referencing Churchill River along its banks their traditional territory is located.

Demographics
As of May 2012 the total membership of English River Dene First Nation was 1,451 with 774 members living on-reserve and 677 members living off-reserve.

Territory
The English River Dene Nation based in Patuanak has territory at fifteen sites.
 
Cree Lake 192G on the south west side of Cree lake is 1607.40 hectares 
Cable Bay 192M on Cree Lake is 538.30 hectares  
Barkwell Bay 192I at the northern end of Cree Lake is 2344 hectares   One of the two sites at the south end may include the old Cree Lake settlement.
Wapachewunak 192D is 1967 hectares.  with 482 residents (Canada Census 2011). It adjoins the northern hamlet of Patuanak
The La Plonge settlement where the Beauval Residential School was located is across the river from the northern village of Beauval and had 115 residents in 2011.
Elak Dase 192A  is 1390.90 hectares on the east side of Knee Lake is home of the Knee Lake settlement at the mouth of the Haultain River. 
English River 192H located on an island in Porter Lake is 42.90 hectares. 
Beauval Forks 192O  is 1.40 hectares.
Flatstone Lake 192L is 230.50 hectares. 
Haultain Lake 192K is 201.20 hectares. 
Grasswoods 192J  is 54.4 hectares.
Île-à-la-Crosse 192E is 5 miles east of Ile a la Crosse at the mouth of the Beaver River  on the shore of Lac Île-à-la-Crosse and is 6 hectares.
Knee Lake 192B (north west shore of Knee Lake) is 487.20 hectares. 
Primeau Lake 192F home of the Primeau Lake settlement  is 1690 hectares.

See also
Denesuline language
Denesuline

References

External links

First Nations governments in Saskatchewan